Spilarctia bipunctata is a moth in the family Erebidae. It was described by Franz Daniel in 1943. It is found in Yunnan and Sichuan in China.

References

Moths described in 1943
bipunctata